The Andronovo culture is a collection of similar local Late Bronze Age cultures that flourished  2000–1450 BC, in eastern Central Asia, spanning from the southern Urals to the upper Yenisei River in central Siberia. Some researchers have preferred to term it an archaeological complex or archaeological horizon. The slightly older Sintashta culture (2050–1900 BC), formerly included within the Andronovo culture, is now considered separately to Early Andronovo cultures. New research shows Andronovo culture's first stage could have begun at the end of the 3rd  millennium BC, with cattle grazing, as natural fodder was by no means difficult to find in the pastures close to dwellings.

Most researchers associate the Andronovo horizon with early Indo-Iranian languages, though it may have overlapped the early Uralic-speaking area at its northern fringe. Allentoft et al. (2015) concluded from their genetic studies that the Andronovo culture and the preceding Sintashta culture should be partially derived from the Corded Ware culture, given the higher proportion of ancestry matching the earlier farmers of Europe, similar to the admixture found in the genomes of the Corded Ware population.

Discovery
The name derives from the village of Andronovo in the Uzhursky District of Kranoyarsk Krai, Siberia, where the Russian zoologist Arkadi Tugarinov discovered its first remains in 1914. Several graves were discovered, with skeletons in crouched positions, buried with richly decorated pottery. The Andronovo culture was first identified by the Russian archaeologist Sergei Teploukhov in the 1920s.

Dating and subcultures

Currently only two sub-cultures are considered as part of Andronovo culture:

Alakul (2000–1700 BC) between Oxus (today Amu Darya), and Jaxartes, Kyzylkum desert
Fëdorovo (2000–1450 BC) in southern Siberia (earliest evidence of cremation and fire cult)

Other authors identified previously the following sub-cultures also as part of Andronovo:

Eastern Fedorovo (1750–1500 BC) in Tian Shan mountains (Northwestern Xinjiang, China), southeastern Kazakhstan, eastern Kyrgyzstan
Alekseyevka (1200–1000 BC) "final Bronze Age phase" in eastern Kazakhstan, contacts with Namazga VI in Turkmenia

Some authors have challenged the chronology and model of eastward spread due to increasing evidence for the earlier presence of these cultural features in parts of east Central Asia.

Geographic extent

The geographical extent of the culture is vast and difficult to delineate exactly. On its western fringes, it overlaps with the approximately contemporaneous, but distinct, Srubna culture in the Volga-Ural interfluvial. To the east, it reaches into the Minusinsk depression, with some sites as far west as the southern Ural Mountains, overlapping with the area of the earlier Afanasevo culture. Additional sites are scattered as far south as the Koppet Dag (Turkmenistan), the Pamir (Tajikistan) and the Tian Shan (Kyrgyzstan). The northern boundary vaguely corresponds to the beginning of the Taiga. More recently, evidence for the presence of the culture in Xinjiang in far-western China has also been found, mainly concentrated in the area comprising Tashkurgan, Ili, Bortala, and Tacheng area. In the Volga basin, interaction with the Srubna culture was the most intense and prolonged, and Federovo style pottery is found as far west as Volgograd. Mallory notes that the Tazabagyab culture south of Andronovo could be an offshoot of the former (or Srubna), alternatively the result of an amalgamation of steppe cultures and the Central Asian oasis cultures (Bishkent culture and Vakhsh culture).

In the initial Sintashta-Petrovka phase, the Andronovo culture is limited to the northern and western steppes in the southern Urals-Kazakhstan. Since then, at the 2nd millennium, in the Alakul Phase (2000–1700 BC), the Fedorovo Phase (1850–1450 BC) and the final Alekseyevka Phase (1400–1000 BC), the Andronovo cultures move intensively eastwards, expanding as far east as the Upper Yenisei River, succeeding the non-Indo-European Okunev culture.

In southern Siberia and Kazakhstan, the Andronovo culture was succeeded by the Karasuk culture (1500–800 BC). On its western border, it is roughly contemporaneous with the Srubna culture, which partly derives from the Abashevo culture. The earliest historical peoples associated with the area are the Cimmerians and Saka/Scythians, appearing in Assyrian records after the decline of the Alekseyevka culture, migrating into Ukraine from ca. the 9th century BC (see also Ukrainian stone stela), and across the Caucasus into Anatolia and Assyria in the late 8th century BC, and possibly also west into Europe as the Thracians (see Thraco-Cimmerian), and the Sigynnae, located by Herodotus beyond the Danube, north of the Thracians, and by Strabo near the Caspian Sea. Both Herodotus and Strabo identify them as Iranian.

Characteristics

The Andronovo culture consisted of both communities that were largely mobile as well as those settled in small villages. Settlements are especially pronounced in its Central Asian parts. Fortifications include ditches, earthen banks as well as timber palisades, of which an estimated twenty have been discovered. Andronovo villages typically contain around two to twenty houses, but settlements containing as much as a hundred houses have been discovered. Andronovo houses were generally constructed from pine, cedar, or birch, and were usually aligned overlooking the banks of rivers. Larger homes range in the size from 80 to 300 m2, and probably belonged to extended families, a typical feature among early Indo-Iranians. Soma may have originated in the Andronovo culture.

Livestock, horse, and agriculture
Andronovo livestock included cattle, horses, sheep, goats and camels. The domestic pig is notably absent, which is typical of a mobile economy. The percentage of cattle among Andronovo remains are significantly higher than among their western Srubna neighbours. The horse was represented on Andronovo sites and was used for both riding and traction.  According to the Journal of Archaeological Science, in July 2020, scientists from South Ural State University studied two Late Bronze Age horses with the aid of radiocarbon dating from Kurgan 5 of the Novoilinovsky 2 cemetery in the Lisakovsk city in the Kostanay region. Researcher Igor Chechushkov, indicated that the Andronovites had an ability on horse riding several centuries earlier than many researchers had previously expected. Among the horses investigated, the stallion was nearly 20 years old and the mare was 18 years old. According to scientists, animals were buried with the person they accompanied throughout their lives, and they were used not only for food, but also for harnessing to vehicles and riding. Agriculture did not play an important role in the Andronovo economy.

Pottery

One of the characteristics of Andronovo culture is its pottery, especially in campsites located in Central Asia, some of them very close to settlements of Bactria–Margiana Archaeological Complex in the south. This pottery is called Incised Coarse Ware (ICW), which is handmade and grey to brown in color, as well as incised with geometrical decoration, spread over much of Eurasian region, from Southern Urals to Kashgar, a pottery made by late Bronze Age nomads.

Metallurgy
The Andronovo culture is notable for regional advances in metallurgy. They mined deposits of copper ore in the Altai Mountains from around the 14th century BC. Bronze objects were numerous, and workshops existed for working copper.

Warfare
"It is likely that militarized elite, whose power was based on the physical control of fellow tribesmen and neighbors with the help of riding and fighting skills, was buried in the Novoilinovsky-2 burial ground. The rider has a significant advantage over the infantryman. There may be another explanation: These elite fulfilled the function of mediating conflicts within the collective, and therefore had power and high social status. Metaphorically, this kind of elite can be called Sheriffs of the Bronze Age"  said Igor Chechushkov.

Burials
The Andronovo dead were buried in timber or stone chambers under both round and rectangular kurgans (tumuli). Burials were accompanied by livestock, wheeled vehicles, cheek-pieces for horses, and weapons, ceramics and ornaments. Among the most notable remains are the burials of chariots, dating from around 2000 BC and possibly earlier. The chariots are found with paired horse-teams, and the ritual burial of the horse in a "head and hooves" cult has also been found. Some Andronovo dead were buried in pairs, of adults or adult and child.

At Kytmanovo in Russia between Mongolia and Kazakhstan, dated 1746–1626 BC, a strain of Yersinia pestis was extracted from a dead woman's tooth in a grave common to her and to two children. This strain's genes express flagellin, which triggers the human immune response. However, by contrast with other prehistoric Yersinia pestis bacteria, the strain does so weakly; later, historic plague does not express flagellin at all, accounting for its virulence. The Kytmanovo strain was therefore under selection toward becoming a plague (although it was not the plague). The three people in that grave all died at the same time, and the researcher believes that this para-plague is what killed them.

Ethnolinguistic affiliation with Indo-Iranians

It is almost universally agreed among scholars that the Andronovo culture was Indo-Iranian. It is credited with the invention of the spoke-wheeled chariot around 2000 BC, if we include the Sintashta culture where the oldest known chariots have been found. The association between the Andronovo culture and the Indo-Iranians is corroborated by the distribution of Iranian place-names across the Andronovo horizon and by the historical evidence of dominance by various Iranian peoples, including Saka (Scythians), Sarmatians and Alans, throughout the Andronovo horizon during the 1st millennium BC.

Sintashta on the upper Ural River, noted for its chariot burials and kurgans containing horse burials, is considered the type site of the Sintashta culture, forming one of the earliest parts of the "Andronovo horizon". It is conjectured that the language spoken was still in the Proto-Indo-Iranian stage.

Comparisons between the archaeological evidence of the Andronovo and textual evidence of Indo-Iranians (i. e. the Vedas and the Avesta) are frequently made to support the Indo-Iranian identity of the Andronovo. The modern explanations for the Indo-Iranianization of Greater Iran and the Indian subcontinent rely heavily on the supposition that the Andronovo expanded southwards into Central Asia or at least achieved linguistic dominance across the Bronze Age urban centres of the region, such as the Bactria–Margiana Archaeological Complex. While the earliest phases of the Andronovo culture are regarded as co-ordinate with the late period of Indo-Iranian linguistic unity, it is likely that in the later period they constituted a branch of the Iranians.  According to Narasimhan et al. (2019), the expansion of the Andronovo culture towards the BMAC took place via the Inner Asia Mountain Corridor.

According to Hiebert, an expansion of the BMAC into Iran and the margin of the Indus Valley is "the best candidate for an archaeological correlate of the introduction of Indo-Iranian speakers to Iran and South Asia," despite the absence of the characteristic timber graves of the steppe in the Near East, or south of the region between Kopet Dagh and Pamir-Karakorum. Mallory acknowledges the difficulties of making a case for expansions from Andronovo to northern India, and that attempts to link the Indo-Aryans to such sites as the Beshkent and Vakhsh cultures "only gets the Indo-Iranian to Central Asia, but not as far as the seats of the Medes, Persians or Indo-Aryans". He has developed the Kulturkugel model that has the Indo-Iranians taking over Bactria-Margiana cultural traits but preserving their language and religion while moving into Iran and India.

Based on its use by Indo-Aryans in Mitanni and Vedic India, its prior absence in the Near East and Harappan India, and its 16th–17th century BC attestation at the Andronovo site of Sintashta, Kuzmina (1994) argues that the chariot corroborates the identification of Andronovo as Indo-Iranian. Klejn (1974) and Brentjes (1981) found the Andronovo culture much too late for an Indo-Iranian identification since chariot-using Aryans appear in Mitanni by the 15th century BC. However,  dated a chariot burial at Krivoye Lake to around 2000 BC.

Eugene Helimski has suggested that the Andronovo people spoke a separate branch of the Indo-Iranian group of languages. He claims that borrowings in the Finno-Ugric languages support this view. Vladimir Napolskikh has proposed that borrowings in Finno-Ugric indicate that the language was specifically of the Indo-Aryan type.

Since older forms of Indo-Iranian words have been taken over in Uralic and Proto-Yeniseian, occupation by some other languages (also lost ones) cannot be ruled out altogether, at least for part of the Andronovo area, i. e., Uralic and Yeniseian.

Physical appearance

The Andronovo have been described by archaeologists as having cranial features similar to ancient and modern European populations. Andronovo skulls are similar to those of the Srubnaya culture and Sintashta culture, exhibiting features such as dolicocephaly. Through Iranian and Indo-Aryan migrations, this physical type expanded southwards and mixed with aboriginal peoples, contributing to the formation of modern populations of India.

Genetics

Fox et al. (2004) established that, during the Bronze and Iron Age period, the majority of the population of Kazakhstan (part of the Andronovo culture during Bronze Age) was of West Eurasian origin (with mtDNA haplogroups such as U, H, HV, T, I and W), and that prior to the thirteenth to seventh century BC, all Kazakh samples belonged to European lineages.

Keyser et al. (2009) published a study of the ancient Siberian cultures, the Andronovo culture, the Karasuk culture, the Tagar culture and the Tashtyk culture. Ten individuals of the Andronovo horizon in southern Siberia from 1400 BC to 1000 BC were surveyed. Extractions of mtDNA from nine individuals were determined to represent two samples of haplogroup U4 and single samples of Z1, T1, U2e, T4, H, K2b and U5a1. Extractions of Y-DNA from one individual was determined to belong to Y-DNA haplogroup C (but not C3), while the other two extractions were determined to belong to haplogroup R1a1a, which is thought to mark the eastward migration of the early Indo-Europeans. Of the individuals surveyed, only two (or 22%) were determined to be of Asian ancestry, while seven (or 78%) were determined to be of European ancestry, with the majority being light-skinned with predominantly light eyes and light hair.

In a June 2015 study published in Nature, one male and three female individuals of Andronovo culture were surveyed. Extraction of Y-DNA from the male was determined to belong to R1a1a1b. Extractions of mtDNA were determined to represent two samples of U4 and two samples of U2e. The people of the Andronovo culture were found to be closely genetically related to the preceding Sintashta culture, which was in turn closely genetically related to the Corded Ware culture, suggesting that the Sintashta culture represented an eastward expansion of Corded Ware peoples. The Corded Ware peoples were in turn found to be closely genetically related to the Beaker culture, the Unetice culture and particularly the peoples of the Nordic Bronze Age. Numerous cultural similarities between the Sintashta/Andronovo culture, the Nordic Bronze Age and the peoples of the Rigveda have been detected.

A genetic study published in Nature in May 2018 examined the remains of an Andronovo female buried ca. 1200 BC. She was found to be a carrier of the maternal haplogroup U2e1h.

In a genetic study published in Science in September 2019, a large number of remains from the Andronovo horizon was examined. The vast majority of Y-DNA extracted belonged to R1a1a1b or various subclades of it (particularly R1a1a1b2a2a). The majority of mtDNA samples extracted belonged to U, although other haplogroups also occurred. The people of the Andronovo culture were found to be closely genetically related to the people of the Corded Ware culture, the Potapovka culture, the Sintashta culture and Srubnaya culture. These were found to harbor mixed ancestry from the Yamnaya culture and peoples of the Central European Middle Neolithic. People in the northwestern areas of Andronovo were found to be "genetically largely homogeneous" and "genetically almost indistinguishable" from Sintashta people. The genetic data suggested that the Andronovo culture and its Sintastha predecessor were ultimately derived of a remigration of Central European peoples with steppe ancestry back into the steppe.

See also

 Aryan
 Multi-cordoned ware culture
 Abashevo culture
 Prehistory of Siberia
 Tazabagyab culture

Notes

References

Sources

 .

 .
 .

Jones-Bley, K.; Zdanovich, D. G. (eds.), Complex Societies of Central Eurasia from the 3rd to the 1st Millennium BC, 2 vols, JIES Monograph Series Nos. 45, 46, Washington D.C. (2002), .

Further reading

 
 Ning, Chao & Zheng, Hong-Xiang & Zhang, Fan & Wu, Sihao & Li, Chunxiang & Zhao, Yongbin & Xu, Yang & Wei, Dong & Wu, Yong & Gao, Shizhu & Jin, Li & Cui, Yinqiu. (2021). "Ancient Mitochondrial Genomes Reveal Extensive Genetic Influence of the Steppe Pastoralists in Western Xinjiang". In: Frontiers in Genetics. 12. 10.3389/fgene.2021.740167.

External links

Center for the Study of Eurasian Nomads (csen.org)
Late Bronze Age Indo-Iranians in Central Asia
Sintashta-Arkaim Culture
The Discovery of Sintashta (a Russian-language article by two archaeologists who directed the excavations)
Archaic Motifs in North Russian Folk Embroidery and Parallels in Ancient Ornamental Designs of the Eurasian Steppe Peoples S. Zharnikova

 
20th-century BC establishments
10th-century BC disestablishments
Archaeological cultures of Central Asia
Archaeological cultures of Northern Asia
Bronze Age cultures of Asia
Archaeological cultures in Kazakhstan
Archaeological cultures in Kyrgyzstan
Archaeological cultures in Russia
Archaeological cultures in Turkmenistan
Archaeological cultures in Uzbekistan
Indo-European archaeological cultures
Indo-Iranian archaeological cultures
Iranian archaeological cultures
History of Ural